Slither is the fourth full-length album by the American metalcore band Earth Crisis, released in 2000. It marked a return to Victory Records, following the band's 1998 Roadrunner Records album, Breed the Killers. The album ventured into the nu metal sound popularized by '90s metal bands Slipknot, Biohazard, and Machine Head.

The album cover was designed by the artist Dave McKean.

The album peaked at No. 50 on the Billboard Top Heatseekers chart.

Production
The album was produced by Steve Evetts.

Critical reception
Chronicles of Chaos wrote: "Managing to stir up enough emotion and deafening cries of aggression, the band storms through a sonic assault of heavy vibes and mosh pit worthy material—and the music of Slither is also chock-full of strong harmonies to boot." The Telegram & Gazette wrote that the songs "boast rich textures as the band combines its old hard-core raucousness with a freshly developed 'clean' heavy-rock sound." The New Straits Times thought that "the lyrics are often contrived and meaningless, which diminishes the power of the music somewhat."

Track listing

Credits
 Karl Buechner - vocals
 Scott Crouse - guitar
 Erick Edwards - guitar
 Ian "Bulldog" Edwards - bass
 Dennis Merrick - drums

References

Earth Crisis albums
2000 albums
Victory Records albums
Albums with cover art by Dave McKean
Albums produced by Steve Evetts